Shendy Puspa Irawati (born 20 May 1987) is an Indonesian badminton player from PB Djarum club. She won the bronze medals at the 2009 Southeast Asian Games, 2011 Summer Universiade, and at the 2013 Asian Championships.

Career 
Irawati competed women's doubles in BWF Super Series at the 2008 Indonesia Super Series, 2009 Malaysia Super Series, and 2009 Korea Open Super Series with her partner, Meiliana Jauhari. Their best result were in the Indonesia and Malaysia where they became to the semi-finalists. In Indonesia, they were lost from Japanese Miyuki Maeda and Satoko Suetsuna, and in Malaysia, they were lost from the Chinese Yang Wei and Zhang Jiewen with 10–21, 15–21.

At the National Championships, she was the mixed doubles runner-up in 2012. At the same year, she also won the bronze medal at the National Sports Week (PON) in the women's doubles and team. Her best achievement is to win the 2014 U.S. Open and Indonesia Masters Grand Prix Gold tournament.

Personal life 
She is from PB Djarum. Her hobbies are listening to music, playing guitar and watching cinema. Generally people called her just Shendy. Her father is Aripin, her mother is Nanik.

Achievements

Asian Championships 
Mixed doubles

Southeast Asian Games 
Women's doubles

Summer Universiade 
Mixed doubles

BWF Grand Prix (5 titles, 8 runners-up) 
The BWF Grand Prix had two levels, the Grand Prix and Grand Prix Gold. It was a series of badminton tournaments sanctioned by the Badminton World Federation (BWF) and played between 2007 and 2017.

Women's doubles

Mixed doubles

  BWF Grand Prix Gold tournament
  BWF Grand Prix tournament

BWF International Challenge/Series (11 titles, 3 runners-up) 
Women's doubles

Mixed doubles

  BWF International Challenge tournament
  BWF International Series tournament

Performance timeline

National team 
 Senior level

Individual competitions 
 Senior level

References

External links 

1987 births
Living people
People from Nganjuk Regency
Sportspeople from East Java
Indonesian female badminton players
Badminton players at the 2010 Asian Games
Asian Games bronze medalists for Indonesia
Asian Games medalists in badminton
Medalists at the 2010 Asian Games
Competitors at the 2009 Southeast Asian Games
Southeast Asian Games silver medalists for Indonesia
Southeast Asian Games bronze medalists for Indonesia
Southeast Asian Games medalists in badminton
Universiade gold medalists for Indonesia
Universiade bronze medalists for Indonesia
Universiade medalists in badminton
Medalists at the 2011 Summer Universiade
20th-century Indonesian women
21st-century Indonesian women